Blepharomastix obscura is a moth in the family Crambidae. The species was first described by (William Warren in 1889. It is found in Brazil.

The wingspan is about 20 mm. The forewings are uniform shining dingy grey, with an obscure dark spot at the end of the cell. The hindwings are a little darker.

References

Moths described in 1889
Blepharomastix